Rakuda Glacier is a glacier flowing to the coast just east of Rakuda Rock in Queen Maud Land. Mapped from surveys and air photos by Japanese Antarctic Research Expedition (JARE), 1957–62, who gave the name.

Rakuda Rock is a projecting coastal rock at the west side of Rakuda Glacier in Queen Maud Land. Mapped from surveys and air photos by Japanese Antarctic Research Expedition (JARE), 1957–62, who gave the name.

See also
 Glaciology
 Hikae Rock
 List of glaciers in the Antarctic

References
 

Glaciers of Queen Maud Land
Prince Olav Coast